"Until the End of Time" is a posthumous single from the 2001 2Pac album of the same name. The song was very successful and was a big contributor to the album going 4x Platinum. The song features R.L. Huggar from the R&B group Next. An alternate version features Mr. Mister's lead singer and bassist Richard Page on vocals and bass. The music video for the song contains a compilation of unreleased footage of Shakur. It charted at #52 on the Billboard Hot 100.

Composition
The song's beat is a sample of Mr. Mister's popular 1985 #1 song "Broken Wings".

Title
The song itself was originally titled "Broken Wings" but was changed just a few weeks prior to its release due to legal issues. Although it was still released as "Broken Wings" or "Broken Wings (Until the End of Time)" in some countries.

Music video
The music video starts off with an interview which 2Pac had after his rape case. It includes unreleased footage of 2Pac recording and writing in a studio. The video also contains clips of music videos from his earlier singles such as "All About U".

Track listing
A1 Until The End Of Time (Clean Radio Edit)		
A2 Until The End Of Time (LP Version)		
B1 Until The End Of Time (Instrumental)		
B2 Until The End Of Time (Clean Radio Edit A Cappella)		
B3 Until The End Of Time (LP A Capella)

Charts

Weekly charts

Year-end charts

Certifications

References

2001 songs
Songs released posthumously
Tupac Shakur songs
2001 singles
Songs written by Tupac Shakur
Songs written by Johnny "J"
Songs written by Richard Page (musician)
Songs written by Steve George (keyboardist)
Song recordings produced by Trackmasters